Cool Springs Township is a non-functioning administrative division of Iredell County, North Carolina, United States. By the requirements of the North Carolina Constitution of 1868, the counties were divided into townships, which included Cool Springs township as one of sixteen townships in Iredell County.

History 

There were very few residents in the area of this township from US Revolutionary times until before the Civil War. A road was established from Statesville to Mocksville that passed through the township in 1829.  This road followed what is now U.S. Highway 64.  The oldest home in the township that was still standing in 2022 was the Dr. John Richard Barr Adams (1820-1901) home, built in 1817.  Dr. Adams was elected to the North Carolina House of Commons in 1852 and 1854 from Iredell County. The area was named for cool springs, which originated in the area, including one active spring that still feeds 5th creek.  There was a post office in Cool Springs as early as 1852. The first postmaster was Marshall Turner. The post office was used until June 1865 when it closed.  There were mills on the 5th Creek as early as 1868.  There was a Cool Springs academy in the early 1900s.  Fred Houpe operated a general store in Cools Spring in the early 1900s.

The communities of Oak Forest was located in Cool Springs Township from 1837-1907 with John B. Belt as the first postmaster.

Sites of interest
The following sites of interest are located in Cool Springs Township:
 Chestnut Grove Baptist Church, founded in early 1900s, 
 Chestnut Grove School, historical (African American)
 Cool Spring Academy, operated as early as 1817
 Cool Springs Baptist Church, 1913-1941
 Cool Spring Elementary School
 Cool Spring School (originally from 1898, new building 1922—1966), combined grades one through twelve, Cool Spring High School (1949-1966)
 Cool Spring United Methodist Church, founded in 1909
 Cool Springs Volunteer Fire Department, organized in 1960
 Countryside Baptist Church, 
 East Iredell Middle School,
 Faith Church
 Fifth Creek School (historical)
 Fifth Creek Presbyterian Church, founded in 1846, 
 Henry Eccles House (formerly known as the old "Montgomery House", built in 1850 and on the National Register of Historic Places, 
 John B. Knox home, built in 1826 but destroyed by fire in the 1980s, 
 Lewis Cemetery (tombstones of early colonial settlers along Fifth Creek)
 Mountain View Methodist Church
 New Hope Baptist Church, organized in 1802, second oldest in Iredell County
 Oak Forest Post Office (historical), 
 Providence Methodist Church, founded in 1814
 Shady Nook School (African American)
 Summers School (African American)

Geography 

The Yadkin River forms the northern boundary of the township.  The eastern boundary is formed by the Rowan County line.  The town of Statesville is partially within the Cool Springs township. Bodies of water within the township include Beaver Creek and Fifth Creek. 

Cool Springs Township is an election precinct in Iredell County.  Major roads in the township include:
 Cool Springs Road 
 
 Mocksville Highway

See also
 Coolspring Township, LaPorte County, Indiana
 Coolspring Township, Mercer County, Pennsylvania
 Cool Spring Township, Rutherford County, North Carolina

References

Bibliography 
 
 , Library of Congress | 00-110956
 

Townships in Iredell County, North Carolina
Townships in North Carolina
1868 establishments in North Carolina